Immanuel Baptist Church is a historic Baptist church located at Rochester in Monroe County, New York.  It is a Tudor Revival-style church building that consists of a one and half story front gable auditorium connected to a "T"-plan -story school wing.

It was listed on the National Register of Historic Places in 2002.

Gallery

References

External links
Every Week (Immanuel Baptist Church)

Churches on the National Register of Historic Places in New York (state)
Baptist churches in New York (state)
Churches completed in 1925
Churches in Rochester, New York
National Register of Historic Places in Rochester, New York